Alliopsis is a genus of root-maggot flies in the family Anthomyiidae. There are at least 70 described species in Alliopsis.

Species
These 76 species belong to the genus Alliopsis:

Alliopsis aertaica (Qian & Fan, 1981)
Alliopsis albipennis (Ringdahl, 1928)
Alliopsis aldrichi (Ringdahl, 1934)
Alliopsis angustitarsis (Malloch, 1920)
Alliopsis arelate (Walker, 1849)
Alliopsis arnaudi Griffiths, 1987
Alliopsis atrifimbriae (Fan & Chen, 1983)
Alliopsis atronitens (Strobl, 1893)
Alliopsis attenuata Griffiths, 1987
Alliopsis austriaca (Hennig, 1976)
Alliopsis badia (Walker, 1849)
Alliopsis benanderi (Ringdahl, 1926)
Alliopsis billbergi (Zetterstedt, 1838)
Alliopsis brevior Huckett, 1965
Alliopsis brevitarsis (Malloch, 1918)
Alliopsis brunetta (Huckett, 1929)
Alliopsis brunneigena (Schnabl, 1915)
Alliopsis conifrons (Zetterstedt, 1845)
Alliopsis constrictor (Malloch, 1920)
Alliopsis cordillerana Griffiths, 1987
Alliopsis ctenostylata Li & Deng, 1981
Alliopsis curvifemoralis Fan & Wu, 1983
Alliopsis dasyops (Fan, 1983)
Alliopsis delioides (Fan, 1983)
Alliopsis denticauda (Zetterstedt, 1838)
Alliopsis dentilamella Fan & Wu, 1983
Alliopsis dentiventris (Ringdahl, 1918)
Alliopsis flavipes (Fan & Cui, 1983)
Alliopsis fractiseta (Stein, 1908)
Alliopsis freyi (Ringdahl, 1932)
Alliopsis fruticosa Fan, 1983
Alliopsis genalis (Huckett, 1050)
Alliopsis gentilis (Huckett, 1950)
Alliopsis gigantosternita Fan, 1983
Alliopsis glacialis (Zetterstedt, 1845)
Alliopsis gymnophthalma Hennig, 1976
Alliopsis hemiliostylata Fan & Wu, 1983
Alliopsis heterochaeta Fan & Wu, 1983
Alliopsis heterochaetoides Jin & Fan, 1983
Alliopsis heterophalla Fan & Wu, 1983
Alliopsis hirtitibia Huckett, 1966
Alliopsis incompta Huckett, 1966
Alliopsis kurahashii (Suwa, 1977)
Alliopsis laminata (Zetterstedt, 1838)
Alliopsis latifrons Fan & Wu, 1983
Alliopsis littoralis (Malloch, 1920)
Alliopsis longiceps (Ringdahl, 1935)
Alliopsis longipennis (Ringdahl, 1918)
Alliopsis lutebasicosta (Fan, 1983)
Alliopsis maculifrons (Zetterstedt, 1838)
Alliopsis magnilamella (Fan, 1983)
Alliopsis moerens (Zetterstedt, 1838)
Alliopsis obesa Malloch, 1919
Alliopsis parviceps Huckett, 1965
Alliopsis pilitarsis (Stein, 1900)
Alliopsis plumiseta Griffiths, 1987
Alliopsis probella Fan & Wu, 1983
Alliopsis problella Fan & Wu, 1983
Alliopsis pseudosilvestris Griffiths, 1987
Alliopsis qinghoensis (Hsue, 1981)
Alliopsis rambolitensis (Villeneuve, 1922)
Alliopsis recta (Fan & Cui, 1983)
Alliopsis rectiforceps Fan & Wu, 1983
Alliopsis sepiella (Zetterstedt, 1845)
Alliopsis silvatica (Suwa, 1974)
Alliopsis silvestris (Fallén, 1824)
Alliopsis similaris (Assis-Fonseca, 1966)
Alliopsis simulivora Ackland, 2006
Alliopsis sitiens (Collin, 1943)
Alliopsis subsinuata Fan, 1986
Alliopsis teriolensis (Pokorny, 1893)
Alliopsis tinctipennis (Malloch, 1929)
Alliopsis undulata Griffiths, 1987
Alliopsis uniseta Griffiths, 1987
Alliopsis varicilia (Fan & Wang, 1983)
Alliopsis ventripalmata Fan & Wu, 1983

References

Further reading

External links

 

Anthomyiidae
Articles created by Qbugbot
Schizophora genera